Polepalli is a village in Khammam district in Telangana, India. Polepalli is approximately 10 km north of Khammam. It has an average elevation of 107 metres (351 feet)

References

Villages in Khammam district